Club goods (also artificially scarce goods or toll goods or collective goods) are a type of good in economics, sometimes classified as a subtype of public goods that are excludable but non-rivalrous, at least until reaching a point where congestion occurs. 
Often these goods exhibit high excludability, but at the same time low rivalry in consumption. Thus, club goods have essentially zero marginal costs and are generally provided by what is commonly known as natural monopolies.
Furthermore, club goods have artificial scarcity. Club theory is the area of economics that studies these goods.
One of the most famous provisions was published by Buchanan in 1965 "An Economic Theory of Clubs," in which he addresses the question of how the size of the group influences the voluntary provision of a public good and more fundamentally provides a theoretical structure of communal or collective ownership-consumption arrangements.

Definition matrix

Where club goods are found
Examples of club goods include cinemas, cable television, software as a service, access to copyrighted works, and the services provided by social or religious clubs to their members. The EU is also treated as a club good, since the services it provides can be excluded from non-EU member states, but several services are nonrival in consumption. These include the free movement of goods, services, persons and capital within the Internal Market, and participation in a common currency: for example, adding extra countries to the Schengen Area would not make it more difficult for citizens of current EU members to move between countries.

Public goods with benefits restricted to a specific group may be considered club goods. For example, expenditures that benefit all of the children in a household but not the adults. The existence of club goods for children may offset the effects of sibling competition for private investments in larger families. While a large number of children in a family would usually reduce private investment ratios per child, due to competition for resources, the effects of a larger family on club goods are not as straightforward. As a result of economies of scale, investment ratios in club goods may eventually increase, since the relative price decreases when, in this example, a larger family consumes a club good. They are called child-specific goods and can also be referred to as club goods.

Specific examples for private club goods are memberships in gyms, golf clubs, or swimming pools. Both organisations generate additional fees per use. For example, a person may not use a swimming pool very regularly. Therefore, instead of having a private pool, you become member of a club pool. By charging membership fees, every club member pays for the pool, making it a common property resource, but still excludable, since only members are allowed to use it. Hence, the service is excludable, but it is nonetheless nonrival in consumption, at least until a certain level of congestion is reached. The idea is that individual consumption and payment is low, but aggregate consumption enables economies of scale and drives down unit production costs.

In Israel
Analyzing Ultra-Orthodox Jews in Israel, economist Eli Berman writes:

Club theory
James M. Buchanan developed club theory (the study of club goods in economics) in his 1965 paper, "An Economic Theory of Clubs". He found that in neo-classical economic theory and theoretical welfare economics is exclusively about private property and all goods and services are privately consumed or utilized. Just over the last two decades before his provision in 1965, scholars started to extend the theoretical framework and communal or collective ownership-consumption arrangements were considered as well.

Paul A. Samuelson made an important provision in this regard, making a sharp conceptual distinction between goods that are purely private and goods that are purely public. While it extended the previously existing theoretical framework, Buchanan found that there was still a missing link that would cover the whole spectrum of ownership consumption possibilities. This gap contained goods that were excludable, shared by more people than typically share a private good, but fewer people than typically share a public good. The whole spectrum would cover purely private activities on one side and purely public or collectivized activities on the other side. Therefore, according to Buchanan, a theory of clubs needed to be added to the field.

The goal of his theory was to address the question of determining the "size of the most desirable cost and consumption sharing arrangement".<ref>James M. Buchanan 1965. "An Economic Theory of Clubs," Economica, 32(125), N.S., pp. 1-14.  Reprinted in James M. Buchanan (2001). Externalities and Public Expenditure Theory, The Collected Works of James M. Buchanan, Volume 15, pp. 193-209 (Indianapolis: The Liberty Fund); and, Robert E. Kuenne, ed. (2000). Readings in Social Welfare, pp. 73-85.</ref>

The model was based on the assumptions that individuals have similar preferences for both private and public goods, the size of the club good and equal sharing of costs. The economic theory of clubs further tries to answer the undersupply equilibrium of a public good provision. Provision of club goods may sometimes pose an alternative to public good provisions by the federal or central government. An issue of club theory is that it may not result in equal and democratic distribution of the good eventually due to its excludability characteristic. James M. Buchanan was primarily interested in voluntary clubs. In these cases club good theory can critically assess how to achieve an optimal number of members of a club as well as the maximum utility for club members.

Examples of private goods that Buchanan offered to illustrate this concept were hair cuts and shoes.  Two people can't wear the same exact pair of shoes at the same time, but two or more people can take turns wearing them.  As the number of people sharing the same pair of shoes increases, the amount of utility each person derives from the shoes diminishes.
For the case of service, like a haircut, the same logic applies. Sharing a haircut means, one-half haircut per month is consumed, or half a physical unit of service. Therefore, the utility for the person deriving from the service declines.

Using the example of a swimming pool facility, James M. Buchanan states that:

But each new member (or co-owner) helps reduce the cost of the club good, so there will be some optimal size of the good that maximizes the benefit for its members.

In the 90s Richard Cornes and Todd Sandler came up with three conditions to determine the optimal club size, which were based at equating costs and benefits at the margin.
Firstly, the provision condition which requires determination of the benefits to members from reducing congestion costs and set them in comparison to the cost of capacity. 
Secondly a utilisation condition, which requires an efficient use of the capacity. Here the user fees equate the members marginal benefit from consumption and the congestion costs the member's participation imposes on others. If the fee is set too low, the club's capacity will be overused, if the fee is too high the capacity will be underutilized. Hence, the club good must be priced in a way that reflects members preferences for crowding.

The third condition is that new members are added to the club, until the marginal benefit from additional membership is equal to the marginal congestion costs.

Because of the three conditions, there is usually a two-part pricing of club goods. One is the fixed up-front membership fees and the other is the per unit charge to achieve an optimal utilisation. In the case of a pure public good, like political lobbying a two-part pricing is not feasible, but a club can provide selective incentives, also called Member-only privileges, like subscribing to the club's magazine or journal. Since clubs compete for members, as long as clubs can be closed freely and members are free to exit, prices for clubs will be in line with costs. The free exit option prevents clubs from charging prices that are too high, but incentivizes free-riding. Members understate their benefits, reduce their effort they supply towards achieving the club's collective goals and take advantage of other club members.

The theory of clubs has been intensively applied to the realm of international alliances. Olson and Zeckhauser (1967) published a cost-sharing analysis of the North Atlantic Treaty Organisation (NATO). In particular they identify the conditions under which it would be in the interest of the club members to increase the size of NATO. According to them every members pay contribution fees, based on their specific marginal values. Therefore, costs shares are computed based on the club's total costs and group size. They point out that the United States is by far the largest contributor to NATO and by that to the collective goal of the institution. The question raised is whether the differences in membership contribution are reasonable given each country's valuation of the provided good by the alliance. Otherwise, the distribution of cost shares is unjust and several member states are free riding.

See also
 Benefit principle
 Collaborative consumption
 Exit (economics)
 Yield management
 Public choice
 Public finance
 Tax choice 
 The Logic of Collective Action Voluntarism (action)
 Fair division among groups – a variant of fair division in which the pieces of a resource are given to pre-determined groups and become club goods in these groups.

Notes

References
 Cornes, Richard and Sandler, Todd, [1986] 1996. The Theory of Externalities, Public Goods, and Club Goods, 2nd ed. Cambridge University Press. Description and chapter-preview links.
 Marciano, Alain, 2011. "Buchanan on Externalities: An Exercise in Applied Subjectivism," Journal of Economic Behavior & Organization, 80(2), pp. 280–289. Abstract.
 _. - Why markets do not fail. Buchanan on voluntary cooperation and externalities page 40
 McNutt, Paddy - The Economics of Public Choice
 Mendoza, Roger Lee, 2012.  "Club Goods in the Health and Wellness Sector."  Current Research Journal of Economic Theory'', 44(2), pp. 18–28.  Abstract.
 Mancur Olson, Richard Zeckhauser (1966) "An Economic Theory of Alliances." "Review of Economics and Statistics", Vol. 48, pp. 266–279.
 Potoski, Matthew and Prakash, Aseem - Voluntary Programs: A Club Theory Perspective
 Rowley, Charles Kershaw and Schneider, Friedrich - The Encyclopedia of Public Choice, Volume 2 page 176
 Sandler, Todd and Tschirhart, John - Club theory: Thirty years later
 Wellisch, Dietmar - Theory of Public Finance in a Federal State

External links
 EconPort Classification Table for Types of Goods

Goods (economics)
Public choice theory
Public finance